WEDU (channel 3) is a PBS member television station licensed to Tampa, Florida, United States, serving the Tampa Bay area. Owned by Florida West Coast Public Broadcasting, it is a sister station to fellow PBS member WEDQ (channel 3.4). The two stations share studios on North Boulevard in Tampa, and transmitter facilities in Riverview, Florida.

History

The station first signed on the air on October 17, 1958. For many years, WEDU has been one of the highest-rated stations in the PBS system. At one point, it was the third most-watched PBS member station in the country.

On February 8, 2017, USF announced that the license for secondary PBS outlet WUSF-TV had been sold for $18.8 million in the FCC spectrum auction, and that it would cease operations; on August 11, it announced that the station would go off the air on October 15.

On October 8, it was announced that WUSF-TV had entered into a channel sharing agreement with WEDU, enabling the station to continue operations. WUSF-TV's broadcast license would also be transferred to WEDU's owner, Florida West Coast Public Broadcasting; the transfer was completed on January 24, 2018.

On October 16, 2017 at midnight, WEDU began airing two of WUSF-TV's former subchannels, PBS Kids and Create, located on 3.5 and 3.6, respectively. Also on that date, WUSF-TV changed its calls to WEDQ, and began airing the secondary lineup of PBS programming that had previously aired on WEDU's fourth subchannel under the branding "WEDU Plus."

Technical information

Subchannels
The station's digital signal is multiplexed:

Analog-to-digital conversion
WEDU shut down its analog signal, over VHF channel 3, on February 17, 2009, to conclude the federally mandated transition from analog to digital television. The station moved its digital signal from its pre-transition UHF channel 54.  That channel was among the high band UHF channels (52-69) that were removed from broadcast service.  On June 12, 2009, it moved to VHF channel 13. Channel 13 originally was the analog channel for Fox owned-and-operated station WTVT but that station vacated Channel 13 on the rescheduled date of the digital television transition,  using PSIP to display WEDU's virtual channel as 3 on digital television receivers.

References

External links
Official website

PBS member stations
Television channels and stations established in 1958
EDU
1958 establishments in Florida